Kharshinde village is located in Sangamner Tehsil of Ahmadnagar district in Maharashtra, India. It is situated 38 km away from sub-district headquarter Sangamner and 80 km away from district headquarter Ahmadnagar. As per 2009 stats, Kharshinde village is also a gram panchayat. The total geographical area of village is 899.42 hectares. Kharshinde has a total population of 1,155 peoples. There are about 228 houses in Kharshinde village. As per 2019 stats, Kharshinde villages comes under Sangamner assembly & Shirdi parliamentary constituency. Sangamner is nearest town to Kharshinde which is approximately 38 km away.

References 

Villages in Ahmednagar district